Salvia orbignaei is an undershrub that is endemic to Bolivia, growing on rocky slopes with other low shrubs at  elevation. It frequently appears following landslides or road building.

Notes

orbignaei
Flora of Bolivia